The Illawarra Health and Medical Research Institute (IHMRI) is an independent health and medical research institute based in Wollongong, New South Wales.

The institute covers a broad range of research themes including diagnostics and therapeutics, chronic conditions and lifestyle and mental health and ageing brain.

IHMRI’s purpose is to support and grow health and medical research in the Illawarra region. The institute connects academic and clinical researchers to better understand and treat a range of diseases and conditions. There are currently over 650 affiliated researchers, clinicians, PHD candidates and research staff under IHMRI.

History

In 2006, the University of Wollongong (UOW) and the South Eastern Sydney Illawarra Area Health Service (SESIAHS) signed a memorandum of understanding to foster and expand health and medical research in the Illawarra.

IHMRI was formally constituted as a company limited by guarantee in 2008, with the UOW and SESIAHS (now the Illawarra Shoalhaven Local Health District) as its founding members.

Professor Don Iverson was appointed as IHMRI’s inaugural Executive Director and Sue Baker-Finch appointed as Chief Operating Officer.

A contribution of $15 million from the NSW Government was matched by $15 million from the UOW to allow construction of a headquarters for IHMRI, with research laboratories and clinical trial research facilities. In July 2010, IHMRI’s headquarters were completed and officially opened by the then NSW Deputy Premier, the Hon Carmel Tebbutt.

In 2014, IHMRI was recognised by the NSW State Government as an independent Medical Research Institute (MRI), allowing access to funding from the NSW Government’s Medical Research Support Program (MRSP).

In 2020, IHMRI became a member of the Association of Australian Medical Research Institutes (AAMRI), an association of medical research institutes across Australia.

Research

Diagnostics and therapeutics
Researchers in this theme explore the fundamental mechanisms of disease. They use this knowledge to design and test new drugs, as well as medical devices. They work together to increase treatment options and quality of life for patients with complex medical conditions.

Chronic conditions and lifestyle
Researchers in this theme study the links between disease and lifestyle risk factors, such as excess weight, poor diet, high blood pressure and physical inactivity. They work together to find better treatments and prevention strategies to extend healthy ageing.

Mental health and ageing brain
Researchers in this theme examine the mechanisms, causes and treatment of psychiatric illnesses, neurodegenerative diseases and neurodevelopmental disorders. Together they seek to address the burden of mental illness and neurodegenerative diseases.

Governance

IHMRI is governed by a board of directors consisting of two directors each from UOW and ISLHD, as well as five independent directors.

Current Board of Directors

Patrick Reid
 Professor Simon Gandevia
 Maree Kerr
 Dr Paul Moy
 Professor Patricia M. Davidson (UOW)
 Professor Jennifer L Martin AC (UOW)
 Professor Denis King OAM (ISLHD)
 Margot Mains (ISLHD)

Patron

 Dame Bridget Ogilvie (AC, DBE, ScD, FRS, FAA)

Board Chairpersons and Executive Staff to date

Chair
 George Edgar (Mar 2009- Mar 2012)
 Alan Pettigrew (Mar 2014-Feb 2020)
 Tim Berry (Acting) (Feb - July 2020)
 Stephen Andersen OAM (Jul 20 - Dec 21)

Executive Director
 Don Iverson (Apr 2008 - Dec 2012)
 Xu-Feng Huang (Acting) (Jan – Jun 2013)
 Mike Calford (Jul 2013 – Mar 2014)
 Brett Garner (Acting) (Mar – Dec 2014)
 Alan Pettigrew (Acting) (Jan - Nov 2015)
 David Adams (Dec 2015–present)

CHIEF OPERATING OFFICER
 Sue Baker-Finch (Oct 2008-Feb 2016)
 Kara Lamond (Aug 2016–present)

References

External links
 Illawarra Health and Medical Research Institute

, University of Wollongong

Medical research institutes in New South Wales